Howell Webster Melton Sr. (December 15, 1923 – December 18, 2015) was an American lawyer and United States district judge of the United States District Court for the Middle District of Florida.

Education and career
Born in Atlanta, Georgia, Melton graduated from the University of Florida in 1943 with his Associate of Arts degree. Melton served in the United States Army from 1943 to 1946 during World War II and attended the Fredric G. Levin College of Law at the University of Florida, receiving his Juris Doctor in 1948. He remained in the United States Army Reserve with the Judge Advocate General's Corps from 1949 to 1953 and became a 1st lieutenant. Melton was in private practice in St. Augustine, Florida from 1948 until 1961. He was a county attorney for St. Johns County from 1959 to 1960. He served as a circuit judge of the 7th Judicial Circuit of Florida from 1961 to 1977.

Federal judicial service

President Jimmy Carter nominated Melton to the United States District Court for the Middle District of Florida on March 29, 1977, to the seat vacated by Judge Gerald Bard Tjoflat. He was confirmed by the United States Senate on April 25, 1977, and received his commission the next day. Melton assumed senior status on February 1, 1991, serving in that status until his death on December 18, 2015, at his St. Augustine home.

Personal

Melton's son, Howell W. Melton Jr., is a retired attorney formerly with Holland & Knight.

References

Sources

1923 births
2015 deaths
20th-century American judges
People from Atlanta
People from St. Augustine, Florida
Fredric G. Levin College of Law alumni
Florida state court judges
United States Army Judge Advocate General's Corps
Judges of the United States District Court for the Middle District of Florida
United States district court judges appointed by Jimmy Carter
United States Army officers
United States Army reservists
University of Florida alumni